Jack Calder was a Scottish football forward who played seven seasons in the American Soccer League.

Calder began his career in Scotland. In 1948, he moved to the Kearny Scots of the American Soccer League. In 1948, the Scots won the Lewis Cup. He then moved to Newark Portuguese where he led the league in scoring during the 1953–54 American Soccer League season. In 1955, he played for New York Brookhattan.

References

American Soccer League (1933–1983) players
Kearny Scots players
Newark Portuguese players
New York Brookhattan players
Scottish footballers
Scottish expatriate footballers
Living people
Year of birth missing (living people)
Association football forwards
Scottish expatriate sportspeople in the United States
Expatriate soccer players in the United States